Federico Delbonis was the defending champion but retired in the first round against Reda El Amrani.

Borna Ćorić won his first ATP title, defeating Philipp Kohlschreiber in the final, 5–7, 7–6(7–3), 7–5.

Seeds
The top four seeds receive a bye into the second round.

Draw

Finals

Top half

Bottom half

Qualifying

Seeds

Qualifiers

Lucky loser

Qualifying draw

First qualifier

Second qualifier

Third qualifier

Fourth qualifier

References
 Main Draw
 Qualifying Draw

Singles